Synaptotagmin XIV is a protein that in humans is encoded by the SYT14 gene.

Function 
This gene is a member of the synaptotagmin gene family and encodes a protein similar to other family members that mediate membrane trafficking in synaptic transmission. The encoded protein is a calcium-independent synaptotagmin.

Clinical relevance 
Mutations in this gene have been shown to cause autosomal recessive spinocerebellar ataxia with psychomotor retardation.

References

Further reading